Hip to the Jag is the debut solo studio album by Iranian-born musician Kavus Torabi released on Believers Roast on 22 May 2020.

Critical reception 
In his review for Louder, Joe Banks called the album "a meditation on – and sometimes confrontation with – unseen worlds and the realm beyond the senses." Roger Trenwith of The Progressive Aspect said that the album "leaves you feeling sad and happy all at once, and it has taken you on a journey through Kavus’s soul, and maybe shone a light into yours, too." On Echoes and Dust, Zachary Nathanson noted that Torabi "doesn’t pull any punches bringing his own music to life with his debut solo album [...] He always wants to push forwards and see what the next flight will take him to next. Is he ever going to slow down? Absolutely not. But Hip to the Jag is the album we need to have music inside our systems for a time of healing in 2020."

Track listing

References

External links 
 

2020 debut albums